The Oconaluftee Indian Village is a replica of an 18th-century eastern Cherokee community founded in 1952 and located along the Oconaluftee River in Cherokee, North Carolina, United States.

History 
The Cherokee "living museum" founded by the Eastern Band of Cherokee in 1952, and is operated by the Cherokee Historical Association. The Eastern Band of Cherokee also established other local attractions, including in 1948 with the Museum of the Cherokee Indian; and in 1950 with the Unto These Hills outdoor theater series. Guides take visitors through the village explaining the history and culture of the Cherokee and also demonstrate the making of such items as arrowheads, baskets, and blowguns.

See also 
 Cherokee Botanical Garden and Nature Trail

References

External links 
 Cherokee Adventure website
 Oconaluftee River Trail at visitcherokeenc.com

Cherokee culture
Eastern Band of Cherokee Indians
Museums in Swain County, North Carolina
History of the Cherokee
Living museums in North Carolina
Native American museums in North Carolina
Ethnographic museums in the United States